A flashover is the near-simultaneous ignition of most of the directly exposed combustible material in an enclosed area. When certain organic materials are heated, they undergo thermal decomposition and release flammable gases. Flashover occurs when the majority of the exposed surfaces in a space are heated to their autoignition temperature and emit flammable gases (see also flash point).

An example of flashover is the ignition of a piece of furniture in a domestic room. The fire involving the initial piece of furniture can produce a layer of hot smoke, which spreads across the ceiling in the room. The hot buoyant smoke layer grows in depth, as it is bounded by the walls of the room. The radiated heat from this layer heats the surfaces of the directly exposed combustible materials in the room, causing them to give off flammable gases, via pyrolysis. When the temperatures of the evolved gases becomes high enough, these gases will ignite throughout their extent.

Types
The original Swedish terminology related to the term 'flashover' has been altered in its translation to conform with current European and North American accepted [scientific] definitions as follows:

 A lean flashover (sometimes called rollover) is the ignition of the gas layer under the ceiling, leading to total involvement of the compartment. The fuel/air ratio is at the bottom region of the flammability range (i.e. lean).
 A rich flashover occurs when the flammable gases are ignited while at the upper region of the flammability range (i.e. rich). This can happen in rooms where the fire subsided because of lack of oxygen. The ignition source can be a smouldering object, or the stirring up of embers by the air track. Such an event is known as backdraft.
 A delayed flashover occurs when the colder gray smoke cloud ignites after congregating outside of its room of origin. This results in a volatile situation, and if the ignition occurs at the ideal mixture, the result can be a violent smoke gas explosion. This is referred to as smoke explosion or fire gas ignition depending on the severity of the combustion process.
 A hot rich flashover occurs when the hot smoke with flammable gas ratio above the upper limit of flammability range and temperature higher than the ignition temperature leaves the compartment. Upon dilution with air it can spontaneously ignite, and the resultant flame can propagate back into the compartment, resulting in an event similar to a rich flashover. The common definition of this process is known as auto-ignition, which is another form of fire gas ignition.

Dangers
Flashover is one of the most-feared phenomena among firefighters. Firefighters are taught to recognize the signs of imminent rollovers and flashovers and to avoid backdrafts. For example, they have certain routines for opening closed doors to buildings and compartments on fire, known as door entry procedures, ensuring fire crew safety where possible.

Indicators

The following are some of the signs that firefighters are looking for when they attempt to determine whether a flashover is likely to occur.

 Fast dark smoke.
 The neutral plane is moving down towards the floor. In this situation, a flashover is plausible.
 All directly exposed combustible materials are showing signs of pyrolysis.
 "Rollover" or tongues of fire appear (known as "angel fingers" to firefighters) as gases reach their auto-ignition temperatures.
 There is a rapid build-up (or "spike") in temperature due to the compound effect of rapidly burning (i.e., deflagrating) gases and the thermal cycle they produce. This is generally the best indication of a flashover.
 The fire is in a ventilated compartment, so there is no shortage of oxygen in the room.

Firefighters memorize a chant to help remember these during training: "Thick dark smoke, high heat, rollover, free burning."

The colour of the smoke is often considered as well, but there is no connection between the colour of the smoke and the risk of flashovers. Traditionally, black, dense smoke was considered particularly dangerous, but history shows this to be an unreliable indicator. For example, there was a fire in a rubber mattress factory in London in 1975 which produced white smoke. The white smoke was not considered dangerous, so firefighters decided to ventilate, which caused a smoke explosion and killed two firefighters. The white smoke from the pyrolysis of the rubber turned out to be extremely flammable.

See also 

 Air Canada Flight 797
 Backdraft
 Charleston Sofa Super Store fire
 Firestorm
 Kilbirnie Street fire (1972)
 King's Cross fire (1987) (flashover happened in escalator shaft)
 MGM Grand fire (1980)
 Ufa train disaster (1989) (caused by massive gas leak in the open air, triggered by sparks from trains' brakes)

References

External links

Living Room Flashover Video
Rapid Fire Progress & Flashover related fire development
Realistic hot fire training to deal safely with flashover and backdraft
Flashover / Backdraft training
Presentation and video of a flashover in a living room (Forschungsstelle für Brandschutztechnik (Karlsruhe Institute of Technology - KIT))
Flashover training Croatia
French site about structural firefighting
Flashover during house fire in Baltimore, MD.  Video taken January 2010
Flashover Slow Motion

Combustion
Fire protection
Firefighting
Thermodynamics
Types of fire